Thomas James Walker (born 12 December 1995) is an English professional footballer who plays as a midfielder for AFC Fylde.

Walker started his career at Bolton Wanderers, and made his first team debut in January 2015. He joined Bury on loan in August 2016, and was released from Bolton at the end of the 2016–17 season. He has since played for Stockport County and F.C. United of Manchester.

Career
Walker joined the academy at Bolton Wanderers at the age of nine, and made his Football League debut ten years later when manager Neil Lennon sent him on as a late substitute for Eiður Guðjohnsen in a 1–1 draw with Leeds United at the Macron Stadium on 10 January 2015. He scored his first senior goal for the "Trotters" in a 1–1 draw with local rivals Wigan Athletic on 21 March. He ended the 2014–15 season with one goal in 11 Championship matches, and signed his first professional contract in May 2015. He featured a further eight times across the 2015–16 relegation campaign.

On 31 August 2016, Walker joined EFL League One rivals Bury on a season-long loan. Manager David Flitcroft revealed how Walker had been on his way to join Leyton Orient on loan when the pair spoke over the phone, Walker was convinced to instead join Bury and he left his car in London and took a train to Manchester to sign with Bury. He scored his first goal for the "Shakers" in a 2–1 defeat at Bradford City in an EFL Trophy match on 4 October. He did not feature for four months before he was introduced as a half-time substitute in a 2–1 defeat at Oxford United on 28 March; after the game manager Lee Clark said "Tom has got lots of ability. He just needs to learn the other side of the game". He made 15 appearances at Gigg Lane across the 2016–17 campaign, but made just one league start. He was released by Bolton manager Phil Parkinson in May 2017.

Walker had undergone a trial at Port Vale in July 2017 but subsequently was not offered a deal by manager Michael Brown. On 25 August 2017, he moved to Stockport County on a short-term deal following a successful trial spell with The Hatters.

He left Stockport on 6 October 2017 after his short-term deal had ended to sign for FC United of Manchester.

On 4 January 2018 Salford City confirmed that they had agreed a deal to sign Walker.

In October 2019 he joined Stockport County on loan until January 2020. He returned to Salford in January 2020 on the expiry of his loan period. The following day he joined AFC Fylde on a permanent, two and a half year contract. He joined newly promoted League Two side Harrogate Town in August 2020 after they triggered a release clause in his contract. On 30 November 2020, Walker joined National League side Notts County on loan until 3 January 2021, with manager Neal Ardley revealing he had already tried to sign him on two occasions but missing out. On 12 February 2021, he rejoined Stockport on another loan deal.

On 17 July 2021, Walker returned to National League side Stockport, this time on a permanent deal, signing a one-year deal with the club. In October 2021, Walker joined National League side Altrincham on a one-month loan deal. In January 2022, Walker returned to AFC Fylde on loan until the end of the season.

On 30 June 2022, Walker agreed to return to AFC Fylde on a permanent basis.

Career statistics

Honours
Salford City
National League play-offs: 2019

References

External links

Living people
1995 births
Footballers from Salford
English footballers
Association football midfielders
Bolton Wanderers F.C. players
Bury F.C. players
Stockport County F.C. players
F.C. United of Manchester players
Salford City F.C. players
AFC Fylde players
Harrogate Town A.F.C. players
Notts County F.C. players
Altrincham F.C. players
English Football League players
National League (English football) players